Trichomycterus anhanga is a species of pencil catfish endemic to Brazil, where it occurs in the Amazon river basin in the state of Amazonas. This species reaches a maximum length of  SL.

References

Further reading

External links

anhanga
Fish of South America
Fish of Brazil
Endemic fauna of Brazil
Fish described in 2012